Pseudorissoina tasmanica is a species of sea snail, a marine gastropod mollusk in the family Pyramidellidae, the pyrams and their allies.

Distribution
This marine species occurs in the Bass Strait, off Tasmania and off Victoria, South Australia.

References

 Cotton, B.C. & Godfrey, F.K. (1932). South Australian Shells. Part 6. South Australian Naturalist. 14 (1): 16-44
 Macpherson, J.H. & Gabriel, C.J. (1962). Marine Mollusca of Victoria. Melbourne : Melbourne Univ. Press. 475 pp.

External links
 To World Register of Marine Species

Pyramidellidae
Gastropods described in 1877